Lathusia is a genus of beetles in the family Cerambycidae, containing the following species:

 Lathusia ferruginea (Bruch, 1908)
 Lathusia parvipilipes (Zajciw, 1959)

References

Rhopalophorini